Owmby is a hamlet in the civil parish of Searby cum Owmby, in the West Lindsey district of Lincolnshire, England. The parish village of Searby is less than 1 mile to the north-east.

History
According to A Dictionary of British Place Names, Owm could be "a farmstead or a village of a man called Authunn" or Old Scandinavian for "uncultivated land or deserted farm", and "by", a "farmstead , village or settlement".

Owmby is mentioned in the Domesday Book as " Odenebi", in the Lindsey Hundred, and the Wapentake of Yarborough. In 1066 the Lord of the Manor was Grimkel. By 1086 a man named William was Lord, and William of Percy was Tenant-in-chief. The Domesday entry does not indicate the two Williams are the same man.

The 1872 White's Directory listed five farmers at Owmby, one of whom was also a land & estate agent.

In 1885 Kelly's Directory noted five farmers and Owmby Mount, a now Grade II listed c.1840 country house at the north-west edge of the hamlet. Living at Owmby Mount in 1885 was the Caistor Rural Sanitation Authority inspector of nuisances and registrar of births marriages and deaths for Caistor sub-district.

A further Owmby listed building is the Grade II Tithe House on Station Lane, a late 18th-century farmhouse with a 20th-century extension.

References

External links

Hamlets in Lincolnshire
West Lindsey District